"Nebridius" was also the name of a close friend of Augustine of Hippo, who is mentioned in his letters.

Saint Nebridius was bishop of Egara (Terrassa) (516–527) and then bishop of Barcelona from 540 to around 547 AD.  His feast day falls on 9 February.  A native of Girona, Nebridius, according to tradition, had three brothers who were also saints.  They were Saint Justus, bishop of Urgell; Saint Elpidius; and Saint Justinian.  He was very learned and wrote interpretations of the Scriptures.  He also wrote a work called In cantica canticorum about the church chants.  He was a Benedictine.

Notes

Catalan Roman Catholic saints
Medieval Spanish saints
Bishops of Barcelona
6th-century bishops in the Visigothic Kingdom
547 deaths
People from Terrassa
Spanish Benedictines
6th-century Christian saints
Year of birth unknown
6th-century Latin writers